Julian Bahula (Order of Ikhamanga) (born 13 March 1938) is a South African  drummer, composer and bandleader, based in Britain.

Biography
Sebothane Julian Bahula was born in Eersterust, Pretoria. He first gained a reputation as a drummer in the band Malombo. He migrated to England in 1973 and subsequently formed the group Jabula, which in 1977 combined with the group of saxophonist Dudu Pukwana to form Jabula Spear. Another later project for Bahula was the band Jazz Afrika. In the 1980s he played with Dick Heckstall-Smith’s Electric Dream ensemble.

As Eugene Chadbourne of AllMusic has written: "Bahula has been as tireless a promoter of the music of his homeland in his adopted country as he is an on-stage rhythm activator. One of his most important moves was establishing a regular Friday night featuring authentic African bands at the London venue The 100 Club. He booked a lot of musicians who were also political refugees; his series began to symbolize a movement for change. Players such as Fela Kuti, Miriam Makeba, and Hugh Masekela were among the performers whose early British appearances were organized by Bahula."

With the Anti-Apartheid Movement, Bahula organised in 1983 African Sounds, a concert at Alexandra Palace to mark the 65th birthday of Nelson Mandela, drawing a 3,000-strong audience and raising the international profile of Mandela and other political prisoners.

In 2012, President Jacob Zuma presented Bahula with the Order of Ikhamanga (Gold).

References

External links 
 Julian Bahula biography, Jabula Music 
 "Julian Bahula, Malombo and Jabula — Discography", Flatint, 2 November 2011
 Eugene Chadbourne, "Julian Bahula", Allmusic
 "Julian Bahula" at Discogs
 Clyde Macfarlaene, "Jabula Happiness: Julian Bahula Interviewed", The Quietus, 21 January 2015.

1938 births
Living people
South African jazz musicians
South African jazz drummers
20th-century jazz composers
People from Pretoria
Recipients of the Order of Ikhamanga
20th-century South African musicians
21st-century South African musicians
South African expatriates in the United Kingdom